{{Infobox religious building
| name 					= Gommateshwara(Bahubali)
| native_name 			= ಗೊಮ್ಮಟೇಶ್ವರ ಪ್ರತಿಮೆ ಕಾರ್ಕಳ | native_name_lang      = kn
| religious_affiliation = Jainism
| image 				= File:Gomateshwara Statue, Karkala.jpg
| alt 					= Gommateshwara statue ಗೊಮ್ಮಟೇಶ್ವರ
| map_type 				= India#Karnataka
| coordinates 			= 
| location 				= Karkala, Karnataka
| deity 				= Bahubali
| creator 				= Veera Pandya Bhairarasa Wodeyar
| festivals      		= Mahavir Jayanti, Das Lakshana
| established			= 1432 C.E.
| website 				= 
| governing_body        = Karkala Jain Math
| temple_quantity       = 18
}}Gommateshwara statue, Karkala (ಗೊಮ್ಮಟೇಶ್ವರ ಪ್ರತಿಮೆ ಕಾರ್ಕಳ) is located at Karkala in the state of Karnataka. It is the second tallest statue of Bahubali in the world with the largest statue located at Shravanabelagola.

 History 
Gommateshwara statue at Karkala was built in 1432 CE by Veera Pandya Bhairarasa Wodeyar''' of Santara dynasty on advice from Lalitakirti, the Bhattaraka of Karkala Jain Matha. The statue was inspired from the larger Gommateshwara statue at Shravanabelagola built in 983 CE.Karkala Gommatesvara Charitre, composed by Chadura Chandrama in 1686 CE, is poem describing the mahamastakabhisheka at Karkala.

 Statue 
The idol is placed on a  pedestal and enclosed by cloistered prakaram. In the entrance room, a few sculptures of Tirthankaras are displayed. In front of the temple is a manastambha with image of Yaksha within a niche. The statue is depicted in kayotsarga posture with curly hair ringlets, large ears and palms stretching up to knees. The idol weighs over 80 tonnes.

Gommateshwara statue at Shravanabelagola, Dharmasthala, Venur, Gommatagiri along with the one in Karkala are the five monolithic statues of Bahubali in Karnataka. The monolithic colossal statues of Bahubali at Shravanabelagola, Karkala and Venur are considered as wonder of the world.

 Mahamastakabhisheka 

Mahamastakabhisheka is organised every 12 years. As the Mahamastakabhisheka'' begins, consecrated water is sprinkled onto the participants by devotees carrying 1,008 specially prepared vessels (Kalashas). The statue is then bathed and anointed with libations such as milk, sugarcane juice, and saffron paste, and sprinkled with powders of sandalwood, turmeric, and vermilion. The event has been attended by multiple political personalities including D. B. Chandregowda & V. S. Ramadevi in 2002, Vajubhai Vala in 2015.

Other temples 
Neighbouring areas have 18 Jain Basadis including Chaturmukha Basadi, Karkala, and Kere Basadi, Anekere. Moodabidri is another important Jain centre near Karkala.

See also 
 Kumbhoj
 Statue of Ahimsa
 Navagraha Jain Temple

References

Citations

Bibliography

Books

Web

External links 
 

Jain rock-cut architecture
Jain pilgrimage sites
Monoliths
Colossal Jain statues in India
Tourist attractions in Karnataka
15th-century sculptures